Chinese Taipei competed at the 1992 Summer Paralympics in Barcelona, Spain. 11 competitors from Chinese Taipei won a single bronze medal and finished joint 50th in the medal table along with five other countries.

See also 
 Chinese Taipei at the Paralympics
 Chinese Taipei at the 1992 Summer Olympics

References 

1992 in Taiwanese sport
Nations at the 1992 Summer Paralympics